KDB Berkat (18) is the second ship of the Ijtihad-class patrol boats. The vessel is in active service in the Royal Brunei Navy (RBN).

Development

Background 
A total of four Ijtihad-class fast patrol boats have been commissioned into service with the Royal Brunei Navy (RBN), where two of the ships began operating since March 2010 followed by another two on 28 August 2010.

Two Ijtihad-class fast patrol boats arrived in Brunei Darussalam on 27 August 2010. The boats, named Kapal Diraja Brunei (KDB) Syafaat and KDB Afiat were commissioned at the RBN Base in Muara, Brunei. They are part of the project between the government of His Majesty The Sultan and Yang Di-Pertuan of Negara Brunei Darussalam and Lürssen Werft.

The commissioning ceremony of both vessels was officiated by Major General Dato Paduka Seri Haji Aminuddin Ihsan bin Pehin Orang Kaya Saiful Mulok Dato Seri Paduka Haji Abidin, Commander of the Royal Brunei Armed Forces (RBAF). Like previous fast patrol boats, KDB Syafaat and KDB Afiat were produced in Germany and completed sea trials. KDB Ijtihad and KDB Berkat began operations on 15 March 2010.

Construction and career 
KDB Berkat was built by Lürssen Werft company in Germany around the 2009. She is part of the first batch delivered from Germany to Brunei. KDB Ijtihad and Berkat commissioned together on 15 March 2010 at Muara Naval Base. All four of her sister ships work in the patrol craft role.

Trans Future 2 Collision 
On 23 February 2014, car carrier Trans Future 2 collided with KDB Berkat near Muara Naval Base.

CARAT 2018 
KDB Darulaman, KDB Berkat, USNS Fall River and USS Emory S. Land conducted Cooperation Afloat Readiness and Training (CARAT) to strengthen the relations between Brunei Darussalam and United States of America. It took place in the South China Sea on 15 November 2018.

Exercise PENGUIN 2018 
Exercise Penguin was held between Royal Australian Navy and Royal Brunei Navy on 18 to 22 October 2018 by KDB Berkat, KDB Darulaman and HMAS Launceston.

An exercise was conducted by HMS Montrose and KDB Berkat on March 26, 2019 in Brunei waters.

14 April 2020, KDB Berkat responded to a report of 4 missing fishermen but they were later found safe on that day.

References 

Ships of Brunei
2009 ships
Fast attack craft
Royal Brunei Navy